The Italian Union of Local Authority Workers (UILFPL) is a trade union representing health and local authority workers in Italy.

The union was founded in 2000, when the Italian Union of Hospital Workers merged with the National Union of Local Authority Employees.  Like both its predecessors, it affiliated to the Italian Labour Union (UIL).  By 2017, it had 225,940 members, making it one of the largest affiliates of the UIL.

General Secretaries
2000: Carlo Fiordaliso
2009: Giovanni Torluccio
2016: Michelangelo Librandi

External links

References

Municipal workers' trade unions
Trade unions established in 2000
Trade unions in Italy